Scivelation (previously known as Salvation) is a third-person shooter video game being developed by Ukrainian developer Black Wing Foundation for Microsoft Windows, Xbox One and PlayStation 4.

Development
The game was initially known as Salvation and was being developed using the Source Engine for PC and Xbox 360. A teaser trailer of this version was released in 2008. In October 2009, it was announced that a publisher has been found and the game was reintroduced as Scivelation, running on the Unreal Engine 3 and being developed for PC, Xbox 360 and PlayStation 3.

Later, it was cancelled, but development restarted in 2013 for the same platforms. In early 2014, the PlayStation 3 and Xbox 360 versions were cancelled and replaced with the new PlayStation 4 and Xbox One versions.

The game was originally planned to be released in 2016, however, this has been continuously delayed and as of 2022, publisher TopWare has yet to announce a release date.

References

External links

Cancelled PlayStation 3 games
Cancelled Xbox 360 games
PlayStation 4 games
Third-person shooters
Unreal Engine games
Windows games
Xbox One games
Vaporware video games